Helen Hiebert (b. 1965 Tennessee) Is an American artist known for her artist's books, installations, papermaking, and books about papercraft.

Her artist's books  are in the collection of the Metropolitan Museum of Art and the Rhode Island School of Design. In 2008 Reed College hosted her installation "The Hydrogen Bond". Her installation "The Wish" is in the Thornton, Colorado public library. In 2022 her installation "Step Into the Light" was also featured at the Thornton public library.  Her installation "Mother Tree" was at the Museum of Motherhood (MoM) from 2021 through 2023.

Hiebert is the author of several book about paper crafts including Papermaking with Garden Plants & Common Weeds, Paper Illuminated, and The Art of Papercraft.

Hiebert's studio is located in Red Cliff, Colorado, where she produces handmade paper and holds papermaking retreats. In 2022 Heibert was included in the North American Hand Papermakers (NAHP) Hall of Papermaking Champions.

References

External links
 images of Hiebert's work at 23 Sandy

1965 births
Living people
Women book artists
Book artists
20th-century American women artists
20th-century American artists
21st-century American women artists
21st-century American artists
Artists from Tennessee